Chris Noonan is a New Zealand legal academic in trade, competition and company law at the University of Auckland. He was appointed the first Chief Trade Adviser to the Pacific Islands Forum in 2009, and resigned from that position in September 2011 and was succeeded by Edwini Kessie, a legal practitioner. He has a PhD and LLB from the University of Auckland.

Education 
Noonan was educated at the University of Auckland and gained both a PhD and LLB. His doctoral thesis was titled The emerging principles of international competition law.

PACER Plus
Noonan was appointed Chief Trade Advisor in 2009 to give independent advice to the Pacific countries during their negotiations over the PACER Plus free trade agreement. The free trade agreement has been controversial with Australia being accused of bullying the smaller Pacific nations. Funding for his office was provided by Australia and had led to battles to maintain both the office's independence and it ongoing funding. Noonan resigned for personal reasons in February 2012.

University of Auckland
Noonan is currently Associate Professor and Associate Dean International in the Faculty of Law at the University of Auckland. He is also an editor the New Zealand Business Law Quarterly, a New Zealand business law journal. The journal is a joint venture between the Research Centre for Business Law at The University of Auckland and Thomson Reuters NZ. It provides in depth analyses of business law issues for both a national and international legal audience.

Trade issues
Noonan is consulted and cited by major New Zealand media outlets on various issues which have included the Fonterra potentially contaminated whey protein and free trade agreements.

In May 2012 he was one of the signatories on an open letter to the negotiators of the Trans-Pacific Partnership 
urging the rejection of investor-state dispute settlement.

Publications
 Bad Poynter: International Cartels and Territorial Jurisdiction. New Zealand Business Law Quarterly, 19 (2), 138–168. 2013
 Slaughterhouse Rules: The Purpose of a Provision in the Commerce Act 1986. New Zealand Business Law Quarterly, 19 (4). 2013
 Trade Negotiations with the Pacific Islands: Promise, Process and Prognosis. New Zealand Yearbook of International Law, 9, 241–283. 2011 
 Defining Directorship. Australian Journal of Corporate Law, 25, 5-26. Noonan, C. G., & Watson, S. M. (2010).
 The Emerging Principles of International Competition Law. Oxford: Oxford University Press, Oxford. Pages: 639. 2008 http://hdl.handle.net/2292/12587 
 Examining Company Directors through the Lens of De Facto Directorship. Journal of Business Law, (7), 587–626. Noonan, C. G., & Watson, S. M. (2008). http://hdl.handle.net/2292/13685 
 The extraterritorial application of New Zealand competition law. New Zealand Universities Law Review, 22 (3), 369–431. Susan Watson and Noonan, C. G. (2007), http://hdl.handle.net/2292/13676 
 The nature of shadow directorship: ad hoc statutory intervention or core company law principle?. Journal of Business Law, Dec, 763–798. Noonan, C. G., & Watson, S. M. (2006). http://hdl.handle.net/2292/13682

References

New Zealand legal scholars
Academic staff of the University of Auckland
Year of birth missing (living people)
Living people
University of Auckland alumni